Montegranaro is a comune (municipality) in the Province of Fermo in the Italian region of Marche, located about  south of Ancona and about  north of Ascoli Piceno. It is one of the main centres for shoe production in Italy.

Main sights
Churches in the town include:
San Serafino
San Francesco
Santi Filippo e Giacomo
Crypt of Sant'Ugo

Twin towns
  Oppeano, Italy
  Aiello del Sabato, Italy

References

External links
Official website

Cities and towns in the Marche